Abdulaziz Al-Thiabi (born 30 July 1992) is a Saudi footballer who played in the Pro League for Al-Nassr and Al-Batin.

References

1992 births
Living people
Saudi Arabian footballers
Al Nassr FC players
Al-Tai FC players
Al-Shoulla FC players
Al-Nahda Club (Saudi Arabia) players
Al Batin FC players
Sportspeople from Riyadh
Saudi First Division League players
Saudi Professional League players
Association football midfielders